Benville may refer to:


Places

Canada
 Benville, original name of Sexsmith, Alberta, a town

United States
 Benville, Illinois, an unincorporated community
 Benville Township, Beltrami County, Minnesota
 Benville Bridge, Bigger Township, Jennings County, Indiana, on the National Register of Historic Places

United Kingdom
 Benville, Dorset, a small settlement
 Benville Manor - see Grade II* listed buildings in West Dorset

People
 E. Benville, a fireman/stoker on the ocean liner Titanic - see Crew of the RMS Titanic